This World Upside Down is the American debut album by Italian jazz guitarist  Fabrizio Sotti.

The album was recorded with Al Foster, John Patitucci, and Randy Brecker.

Track listing

Credits 
 Fabrizio Sotti – guitars, producer
 Randy Brecker – trumpet
 John Patitucci – double bass
 James Genus – double bass
 Cameron Brown – double bass
 Al Foster – drums
 Victor Jones – drums
 Greg Russell – executive producer
 Ben Elliot – engineer
 Rob Reyes – assistant engineer
 Chris Athens – mastering

References

Fabrizio Sotti albums
1999 albums